Heracleides was an architect in the time of the Roman emperor Trajan, who is known by two inscriptions found in Egypt.

Notes

Ancient Roman architects